Wanderers Cricket Club is a Barbadian cricket club. The club plays in the Barbados Cricket Association Elite Division, the highest division of domestic cricket in Barbados. A multi-sport club, Wanderers also possesses a masters football team and a hockey team.

Club history
Wanderers is the oldest existing cricket club in Barbados. The club was founded in 1877 with its initial membership drawn from the social elite of the colony, and exclusively white. The club had a strong rivalry with Pickwick Cricket Club, another white club, but one which drew its membership from a slightly lower social class. Changes in Barbadian society meant that from the 1960s onwards, the membership of Wanderers gradually came to reflect the general Barbadian population.

Location
The club originally played at the Bay Pasture until moving to Dayrells Road, Christ Church, Barbados in 1952.

Players
Some notable international cricketers from Wanderers include:

Notes

References

Cricket teams in Barbados
1877 establishments in Barbados
Cricket clubs established in 1877